Niemieczkowo  is a village in the administrative district of Gmina Oborniki, within Oborniki County, Greater Poland Voivodeship, in west-central Poland.

History
The oldest known mention of Niemieczkowo comes from 1361, when it was owned by local nobleman Jarota Niemieczkowski of Przosna coat of arms. Niemieczkowo was a private village of Polish nobility, administratively located in the Poznań County in the Poznań Voivodeship in the Greater Poland Province of the Polish Crown. It was owned by the Niemieczkowski and Raczyński families. There is a historic manor house of local nobility in the village.

References

Niemieczkowo